The 2022–23 Adelaide Strikers Women's season was the eighth in the team's history. Coached by Luke Williams and captained by Tahlia McGrath, the Strikers finished the regular season of WBBL08 in second position. They subsequently defeated the Brisbane Heat in the Challenger, thereby qualifying for a third Final appearance in four seasons. In the championship decider, the Strikers pulled off an upset victory against the Sydney Sixers to claim their maiden Women's Big Bash League title.

Squad 
Each 2022–23 squad was made up of 15 active players. Teams could sign up to five 'marquee players', with a maximum of three of those from overseas. Marquees were defined as any overseas player, or a local player who holds a Cricket Australia national contract at the start of the WBBL|08 signing period.

Personnel changes made ahead of the season included:

 South African marquee Dane van Niekerk did not re-sign with the Strikers.
 Barbadian marquee Deandra Dottin signed with the Strikers, having previously played for the Perth Scorchers and Brisbane Heat.
 Sarah Coyte departed the Strikers, signing with the Melbourne Renegades.
 Anesu Mushangwe signed with the Strikers as a local player due to her permanent residence in Australia, despite having recently played international cricket for Zimbabwe.
Changes made during the season included:

 Megan Schutt stood in as acting captain for two games while Tahlia McGrath was rested with a back complaint.

The table below lists the Strikers players and their key stats (including runs scored, batting strike rate, wickets taken, economy rate, catches and stumpings) for the season.

Ladder

Fixtures 
All times are AEDT.

Regular season

Challenger

Final

Statistics and awards 
 Most runs: Laura Wolvaardt – 403 (3rd in the league)
 Highest score in an innings: Laura Wolvaardt – 75* (56) vs Sydney Thunder, 20 November 2022
 Most wickets: Megan Schutt – 27 (1st in the league)
 Best bowling figures in an innings: Megan Schutt – 6/19 (3.3 overs) vs Sydney Thunder, 20 November 2022
 Most catches (fielder): Bridget Patterson – 12 (equal 2nd in the league)
 Player of the Match awards:
 Megan Schutt – 2
 Darcie Brown, Deandra Dottin, Katie Mack, Tahlia McGrath, Bridget Patterson, Madeline Penna, Amanda-Jade Wellington – 1 each
 WBBL|08 Player of the Tournament: Megan Schutt (equal 3rd)
 WBBL|08 Team of the Tournament: Megan Schutt, Amanda-Jade Wellington

References

Further reading

 

2022–23 Women's Big Bash League season by team
Adelaide Strikers (WBBL)